Kevin Feiersinger (born February 2, 1992) is a German footballer who plays as a striker, who plays for SV 1920 Wallerfangen.

References

External links

1992 births
Living people
German footballers
Germany youth international footballers
German people of Austrian descent
SV Elversberg players
SVN Zweibrücken players
3. Liga players
US Mondorf-les-Bains players
Association football forwards